Astrid Norberg, born 1939 is a registered nurse and professor emerita in nursing at Umeå University, Sweden. Norberg has a PhD in pedagogy from Lund University and started as a Sweden's first professor in nursing research in 1987. Her research has mainly been about dementia and ethics.

References

Sources
 Medierna varnade för Astrid, Vårdfacket 3 mars 2006 (In Swedish)
 Astrid Norberg: Framtidens omvårdnad: Partnerskap mellan patient och personal (In Swedish)

Swedish nurses
Academic staff of Umeå University
1939 births
Living people
Swedish women academics